Eastwell may refer to:

Eastwell, Kent, England
Eastwell, Leicestershire, England